Kevin Álvarez may refer to:

Kevin Álvarez (footballer, born 1996), Honduran football right-back
Kevin Álvarez (footballer, born 1999), Mexican football right-back